Martina Navratilova was the defending champion, but could not compete this year due to a flu.

Chris Evert Lloyd won the title by defeating Steffi Graf 6–4, 6–2 in the final.

Seeds

Draw

Finals

Top half

Section 1

Section 2

Section 3

Section 4

Bottom half

Section 5

Section 6

Section 7

Section 8

References

External links
 Official results archive (ITF)
 Official results archive (WTA)

Women's Singles
1986 Virginia Slims World Championship Series